|}

The British Champions Sprint Stakes is a Group 1 flat horse race in Great Britain open to horses aged three years or older. It is run at Ascot over a distance of 6 furlongs (1,207 metres), and it is scheduled to take place each year in October.

History
The event was established in 1946, and it was originally called the Diadem Stakes. It was named after Diadem (foaled 1914), a winner of several of Ascot's leading races. For a period it was staged in October, and it later moved to September.

The current system of race grading was introduced in 1971, and the Diadem Stakes initially held Group 3 status. It was promoted to Group 2 level in 1996. It had a prize fund of £100,000 in 2010.

The race was given its present name and switched to October in 2011. It became part of the newly created British Champions Day, and its purse was increased to £250,000. It now serves as the sprint-category final of the British Champions Series. The race was upgraded to Group 1 status from its 2015 running.

Records

Most successful horse (2 wins):
 Set Fair – 1952, 1954
 Jack and Jill – 1958, 1959

Leading jockey (7 wins):
 Lester Piggott – Abergwaun (1971), Home Guard (1972), Saritamer (1974), Swingtime (1975, dead-heat), Absalom (1979), Moorestyle (1981), Salieri (1983)

Leading trainer (4 wins):
 Walter Nightingall – Set Fair (1952, 1954), Jack and Jill (1958, 1959)
 Vincent O'Brien – Abergwaun (1971), Home Guard (1972), Saritamer (1974), Swingtime (1975, dead-heat)

Winners since 1979

Earlier winners

 1946: The Bug
 1947: Djelal
 1948: Combined Operations
 1949: Solonaway
 1950: Abadan
 1951: Ki Ming
 1952: Set Fair
 1953: Rose Coral
 1954: Set Fair
 1955: Pappa Fourway
 1956: King Bruce 
 1957: Arcandy
 1958: Jack and Jill
 1959: Jack and Jill
 1960: Zanzibar 
 1961: Satan
 1962: La Belle
 1963: Sammy Davis 
 1964: Ampney Princess
 1965: Majority Blue
 1966: Lucasland
 1967: Great Bear
 1968: Secret Ray
 1969: Song
 1970: Realm
 1971: Abergwaun
 1972: Home Guard
 1973: Boldboy
 1974: Saritamer
 1975: Roman Warrior / Swingtime 
 1976: Honeyblest
 1977: Gentilhombre
 1978: Creetown

See also
 Horseracing in Great Britain
 List of British flat horse races
 Recurring sporting events established in 1946 – this race is included under its original title, Diadem Stakes.

References

 Paris-Turf: 

 Racing Post:

 galopp-sieger.de – Diadem Stakes.
 horseracingintfed.com – International Federation of Horseracing Authorities – British Champions Sprint Stakes (2018).
 pedigreequery.com – Diadem Stakes – Ascot.
 

Flat races in Great Britain
Ascot Racecourse
Open sprint category horse races
British Champions Series